This is a list of events that happened in 2008 in Mexico.

Incumbents

Federal government
 President: Felipe Calderón 

 Interior Secretary (SEGOB)
Francisco Javier Ramírez Acuña, until January 16
Juan Camilo Mouriño, January 16-November 4 (died in office)
Fernando Gómez Mont, starting November 10
 Secretary of Foreign Affairs (SRE): Patricia Espinosa
 Communications Secretary (SCT): Luis Téllez
 Education Secretary (SEP): Josefina Vázquez Mota
 Secretary of Defense (SEDENA): Guillermo Galván Galván
 Secretary of Navy (SEMAR): Mariano Francisco Saynez Mendoza
 Secretary of Labor and Social Welfare (STPS): Javier Lozano Alarcón
 Secretary of Welfare (SEDESOL) 
Beatriz Zavala, until December 9
Ernesto Cordero Arroyo, starting December 9
 Tourism Secretary (SECTUR): Rodolfo Elizondo Torres
 Secretary of the Environment (SEMARNAT): Juan Rafael Elvira Quesada
 Secretary of Health (SALUD): José Ángel Córdova
Secretary of Public Security (SSP): Genaro García Luna
Secretary of Finance and Public Credit (SHCP): Agustín Carstens
Secretariat of Energy (Mexico) (SENER): Georgina Yamilet Kessel Martínez, starting December 1
Secretary of Agriculture (SAGARPA): Alberto Cárdenas
Secretary of Public Function (FUNCIÓN PÚBLICA): Salvador Vega Casillas
Secretary of Agrarian Reform (SRA): Germán Martínez
Secretary of Economy (SE)
Eduardo Sojo Garza-Aldape, until August 6
Gerardo Ruiz Mateos, starting August 6
Attorney General of Mexico (PRG): Eduardo Medina-Mora Icaza

Supreme Court

 President of the Supreme Court: Guillermo Iberio Ortiz Mayagoitia

Governors

 Aguascalientes: Luis Armando Reynoso, (National Action Party, PAN)
 Baja California: José Guadalupe Osuna Millán, (PAN)
Baja California Sur: Narciso Agúndez Montaño, (Party of the Democratic Revolution (PRD)
 Campeche: Jorge Carlos Hurtado Valdez, (Institutional Revolutionary Party PRI)
 Chiapas: Juan Sabines Guerrero, (Coalition for the Good of All)
 Chihuahua: José Reyes Baeza Terrazas, (Institutional Revolutionary Party PRI)
 Coahuila: Humberto Moreira Valdés, (Institutional Revolutionary Party PRI)
 Colima: Silverio Cavazos, (Institutional Revolutionary Party PRI)
 Durango: Ismael Hernández, (Institutional Revolutionary Party PRI)
 Guanajuato: Juan Manuel Oliva, (National Action Party, PAN)
 Guerrero: René Juárez Cisneros, (Institutional Revolutionary Party PRI)
 Hidalgo: Miguel Ángel Osorio Chong, (Institutional Revolutionary Party PRI)
 Jalisco: Emilio González Márquez, (Institutional Revolutionary Party PRI)
 State of Mexico: Enrique Pena Nieto, (Institutional Revolutionary Party PRI)
 Michoacán: Lázaro Cárdenas Batel, (Party of the Democratic Revolution (PRD) (until 15 February); Leonel Godoy Rangel (Party of the Democratic Revolution (PRD) (from 15 February)
 Morelos: Marco Antonio Adame (PAN).
 Nayarit: Ney González Sánchez
 Nuevo León: José Natividad González Parás, (Institutional Revolutionary Party PRI)
 Oaxaca: Ulises Ruiz Ortiz, (Institutional Revolutionary Party PRI)
 Puebla: Mario Marín Torres, (Institutional Revolutionary Party PRI)
 Querétaro: Francisco Garrido Patrón (National Action Party, PAN)
 Quintana Roo: Félix González Canto, (Institutional Revolutionary Party PRI)
 San Luis Potosí: Jesús Marcelo de los Santos Fraga, (Institutional Revolutionary Party PRI)
 Sinaloa: Jesús Aguilar, (Institutional Revolutionary Party PRI)
 Sonora: Eduardo Bours, (Institutional Revolutionary Party PRI)
 Tabasco: Andrés Rafael Granier Melo, (Institutional Revolutionary Party PRI)
 Tamaulipas: Eugenio Hernández Flores, (Institutional Revolutionary Party PRI)	
 Tlaxcala: Héctor Ortiz Ortiz (National Action Party, PAN)
 Veracruz: Fidel Herrera Beltrán (Institutional Revolutionary Party PRI)	
 Yucatán: Ivonne Ortega Pacheco (Institutional Revolutionary Party PRI)	
 Zacatecas: Amalia García (Party of the Democratic Revolution PRD)
Head of Government of the Federal District: Marcelo Ebrard (PRD)

Events

 Macrolimosna
 June 1–2: Tropical Storm Arthur 2008
 July 20–21: Hurricane Dolly 2008
 August 3–8: XVII International AIDS Conference, 2008 
 September: Riots in the La Mesa Prison 
 September 15: 2008 Morelia grenade attacks 
 October 6–7: Tropical Storm Marco 2008
 November 4: 2008 Mexico City plane crash 
 November 26: Premios Oye! 2008

Elections

 2008 Mexican elections

Awards

	
Belisario Domínguez Medal of Honor - Miguel Ángel Granados Chapa	
Order of the Aztec Eagle	
National Prize for Arts and Sciences	
National Public Administration Prize	
Ohtli Award
 Eliseo Medina
 David Coss 
 Monica C. Lozano
 Patricia Torres-Ray

Popular culture

Sports 

 Primera División de México Clausura 2008 
 2008 Primera División de México Apertura 
 2008 North American SuperLiga 
 2008 InterLiga 
 2008 Carrera Panamericana
 2008 NASCAR Corona Series season 
 2008 Rally México 
 2008 LATAM Challenge Series season 
 2008 Centrobasket 
 2008 CONCACAF Beach Soccer Championship 
 2008 Mexican Figure Skating Championships 
 Homenaje a Dos Leyendas (2008) 
 2008 NORCECA Beach Volleyball Circuit (Manzanillo)
 2008 NORCECA Beach Volleyball Circuit (Guadalajara)
 2008 IIHF World U18 Championship Division III co-hosted with Turkey
 2008 NACAC Under-23 Championships in Athletics 
 2008 AIBA Youth World Boxing Championships 
 2008 FINA Youth World Swimming Championships
 2008 Women's Pan-American Volleyball Cup 
 Mexico at the 2008 Summer Olympics
 Mexico at the 2008 Summer Paralympics

Music

Film

Literature

TV

Telenovelas
 Fuego en la Sangre
 Las Tontas No Van al Cielo
 Alma de Hierro
 Querida Enemiga
 Cuidado con el ángel
 Juro Que Te Amo
 Un Gancho al Corazón
 En Nombre del Amor
 Mañana Es Para Siempre

Notable deaths

 January 10 – Andrés Henestrosa
 January 17 – Alejandro Illescas
 January 30 – Marcial Maciel
 February 2 – Francisco de Santiago Silva, visual artist
 February 11 – Emilio Carballido
 February 25 – Alan Ledesma, 30, actor, stomach cancer.
 March 22 – Adolfo Antonio Suarez Rivera
 April 8 – Jacqueline Voltaire, 59, actress, melanoma.
 April 10 – Ernesto Corripio Ahumada
 April 14 – Miguel Galvan, 50, actor, renal failure.
May 8 – Leopoldo Juárez Urbina, politician (Convergence), former municipal president of Cherán, Michoacán; murdered.
 May 24 – Eugenio Garza Lagüera
June 1 – Marcelo Ibarra Villa, politician , municipal president of Villa Madero, Michoacán; murdered.
June 4 – Manuel de Jesús Angulo Torres, politician , municipal president of Topia, Durango; murdered
 June 21 – Adalberto Almeida y Merino
July 24 – Juan Manuel Orozco Serrano, politician , former municipal president of Cuautitlán, Jalisco; murdered.
 July 25 — Miguel Ángel Gutiérrez Ávila (born 1955)
 July 27 – Isaac Saba Raffoul
 July 30 – Alejandro Aura
 August 30 – Gilberto Rincón Gallardo
September 24 – Héctor Lorenzo Ríos, politician , municipal president of Ayutla, Guerrero; murdered.
 September 29 – Miguel Córcega, 78, actor and director, stroke.
 October 4 – Servando González
October 8 – Salvador Vergara Cruz, politician , municipal president of Ixtapan de la Sal, State of Mexico; murdered.
 November 4 – Juan Camilo Mouriño
 December 2 – Carlos Abascal
 December 12 – Amalia Solórzano, First Lady of Mexico (1934-1940) (b. 1911)

Notes

References

External links